Friedl Haerlin (29 December 1901 – 17 April 1981) was a German stage and film actress.

During the 1930s she worked in cinema playing glamorous roles, mainly in comedy films. In the late 1930s, in order to boost her flagging career, she attempted to gain invitations to receptions given by Adolf Hitler. Her final film was the Austrian comedy Viennese Girls which was made in 1945, but was not released until 1949. Finding that offers of work were drying up, she later immigrated to Peru, although she returned to spend her final years in her Bavarian hometown of Gauting. Whenever she had time, Friedl Haerlin was a passionate racing driver. She set a women's record at the Semmering race in 1929.

Selected filmography
 The Shot in the Pavilion (1925)
 The Stolen Face (1930)
 Queen of the Night (1931)
 The Man Who Murdered (1931)
 Laughing Heirs (1933)
 A Precocious Girl (1934)
 Hilde and the Volkswagen (1936)
 A Woman of No Importance (1936)
 Linen from Ireland (1939)
 Kora Terry (1940)
 Roses in Tyrol (1940)
 The Three Codonas (1940)
 Clarissa (1941)
 Viennese Girls (1949)

References

Bibliography
 d' Almeida, Fabrice. High Society in the Third Reich. Polity, 2008.

External links

1901 births
1981 deaths
German film actresses
German silent film actresses
20th-century German actresses
People from Starnberg (district)